List of champions of the 1897 U.S. National Championships tennis tournament (now known as the US Open). The men's tournament was held from 16 August to 23 August on the outdoor grass courts at the Newport Casino in Newport, Rhode Island. The women's tournament was held from 15 June to 19 June on the outdoor grass courts at the Philadelphia Cricket Club in Philadelphia, Pennsylvania. It was the 18th U.S. National Championships and the second Grand Slam tournament of the year.

Finals

Men's singles

 Robert Wrenn defeated  Wilberforce Eaves  4–6, 8–6, 6–3, 2–6, 6–2

Women's singles

 Juliette Atkinson defeated  Elisabeth Moore  6–3, 6–3, 4–6, 3–6, 6–3

Men's doubles
 Leo Ware /  George Sheldon defeated  Harold Mahony /  Harold Nisbet 11–13, 6–2, 9–7, 1–6, 6–1

Women's doubles
 Juliette Atkinson /  Kathleen Atkinson defeated  Mrs. Edwards /  Elizabeth Rastall 6–2, 6–1, 6–1

Mixed doubles
 Laura Henson /  D.L. Magruder defeated  Maud Banks /  B.L.C. Griffith 6–4, 6–3, 7–5

References

External links
Official US Open website

 
U.S. National Championships
U.S. National Championships (tennis) by year
U.S. National Championships (tennis)
U.S. National Championships (tennis)
U.S. National Championships (tennis)
U.S. National Championships (tennis)